Cottrill is a surname of British origin. Notable people with that name include:
 Deborah Cottrill (born 1963), British competitive figure skater
 Claire Cottrill (born 1998), American singer-songwriter, professionally known as Clairo
 Jedd Philo Clark Cottrill (183289), American politician in Wisconsin
 Joe Cottrill (18881972), British athlete who competed in the 1912 Summer Olympics
 Neil Cottrill (born 1971), English badminton player
 Walter Stanley Cottrill (19142005), South African, 15th Chief of the Staff of The Salvation Army

See also 
 Cottrill Opera House, known since 1915 as Sutton's Opera House or Sutton Theater, a historic vaudeville and movie theater building in Thomas, Tucker County, West Virginia
 Matthew Cottrill House, a historic house in Damariscotta, Maine
 Cotterell (disambiguation)